Vincenzo Zappalà (born 1945) is an Italian astronomer and discoverer of several main-belt asteroids.

He is credited by the Minor Planet Center with the discovered of 9 minor planets. All of his discoveries he made at ESO's Chilean La Silla Observatory in 1984, with the exception of 17357 Lucataliano, which he discovered at Mount Stromlo Observatory in 1978. He has also been a long-term astronomer at the Observatory of Turin in Pino Torinese.

Awards and honors 

The main-belt asteroid 2813 Zappalà, discovered by American astronomer Edward Bowell at the U.S. Anderson Mesa Station in 1981, is named in his honour.

List of discovered minor planets

See also 
 
 Zoran Knežević (astronomer)

References

External links 
 Interview with Vincenzo Zappalà Part 1 
 Interview with Vincenzo Zappalà Part 2 

1945 births
Discoverers of asteroids

20th-century Italian astronomers
Living people